Pukeamoamo / Mitre is the highest mountain of the Tararua Range, situated in the lower North Island of New Zealand.

The mountain was named after its double peak that resembles a bishop's mitre.

References

Mit
Tararua Range